Green is the sixth studio album by American rock band R.E.M., released on November 7, 1988 by Warner Bros. Records. The second album to be produced by the band and Scott Litt, it continued to explore political issues both in its lyrics and packaging. The band experimented on the album, writing major-key rock songs and incorporating new instruments into their sound including the mandolin, as well as switching their original instruments on other songs.

Upon its release, Green was a critical and commercial success. To promote Green, the band embarked on an 11-month world tour and released four singles from the album: "Orange Crush", "Stand", "Pop Song 89", and "Get Up".

Background and recording 
With the release of Document in 1987, R.E.M. fulfilled its contract with I.R.S. Records. Frustrated that its records did not see satisfactory overseas distribution, in early 1988 the band told I.R.S. head Jay Boberg that it was leaving the label. Guitarist Peter Buck also explained that his group felt it was being pressured to sell well by I.R.S., yet felt I.R.S.'s distributor MCA Records did not consider the ensemble a priority. R.E.M.'s management then approached any record companies that expressed interest in the band. Though other labels offered more money, R.E.M. ultimately signed a deal with Warner Bros. Records—reportedly between $6 million and $12 million—due to the company's assurance of total creative freedom. In light of its move to a major label, the band became defensive in interviews against accusations from some fans who claimed it was selling out.

R.E.M. began the album process by recording demos at Robbie Collins' Underground Sound Recording Studio in Athens, Georgia in February 1988. Bill Berry, Peter Buck and Mike Mills recorded the basic tracks in two configurations: (1) drums, guitar, and bass, and (2) percussion, mandolin, and accordion. The demos were mixed by Robbie Collins, Buren Fowler (guitar tech for Peter Buck and later member of Drivin N Cryin), and David LaBruyere (later bassist for Vic Varney, Michelle Malone, and John Mayer) and presented to R.E.M. management. Michael Stipe used these recordings for his vocal arrangements.  Some of these demos, including "Title," "Great Big," "Larry Graham" and "The Last R.E.M. Song," have never been commercially released.  The demo "Larry Graham" was named for Sly and the Family Stone bassist Larry Graham, who was famous for his slap-bass style.  "Larry Graham" has many similarities musically with Out of Time opener "Radio Song."  "Title" was an older song which had been demoed for Document the prior year and performed often on the Work Tour.  "Title" is the only unreleased song from these demo sessions known to have recorded vocals.

Just one month after signing with Warner Bros., the band recorded the basic tracks for Green at Ardent Studios Studio A in Memphis, Tennessee from May 24 through July 5, 1988, with Scott Litt producing.  Recording and mixing resumed later that month at Bearsville Sound Studios in Bearsville, New York.  Three unreleased songs were recorded in Bearsville, including "Carnival" and two untitled songs.  "The Wrong Child" was recorded and mixed under the working title "Mozart."  The Bearsville sessions continued until September 3, 1988—barely two months before Greens release.

 Music 

In a 1988 interview, Peter Buck described Green as an album that didn't feature any typical R.E.M. songs.  Describing the band's standard output as "Minor key, mid-tempo, enigmatic, semi-folk-rock-balladish things", the guitarist noted that for Green, "We wrote major key rock songs and switched instruments." Singer Michael Stipe had reportedly told his bandmates to "not write any more R.E.M.-type songs". Bassist Mike Mills argued that Green was an experimental record, resulting in an album that was "haphazard, a little scattershot". Band biographer David Buckley wrote, "[S]onically, Green is all over the place, the result being a fascinatingly eclectic album rather than a unified artistic move forward".

Green was envisioned as an album where one side would feature electric songs and the other, acoustic material, with the plan failing to come to fruition due to a lack of acoustic songs deemed fit for release. David Buckley highlighted three main musical strands on Green: "ironic pop songs" like "Stand" and "Pop Song 89", harder-hitting tracks such as "Orange Crush" and "Turn You Inside-Out", and "pastoral acoustic numbers" that had Peter Buck playing mandolin, with track 11 singled out as an anomaly. Buck had become fond of playing acoustic music with his friends in that period, and thus purchased an "oddly-shaped Italian mandolin-cum-lyre" in 1987; he would play the instrument on three of the tracks on Green. From this period onward, R.E.M. would swap instruments among members, and on Green the group also incorporated accordion, cello, and lap steel guitar.

 Artwork and packaging 

The cover art was painted by New York City minimalist line painter Jon McCafferty. Promotional copies of the album were housed in a mauve, cloth-covered Digipack, with the title and artist debossed and a number "4" embossed over both of the "R"s. The color and texture are made to imitate tree bark.

The original pressings of the album and cassette tape covers had the number 4 spot varnished over the R in both "Green" and "R.E.M." In return, "R. Stand" appears instead of "4. Stand" on the track list on the back cover. Allegedly, this was a product of an early typing mistake: due to "4" being a number very close to "R" on the keyboard, "Green" was once misspelled "G4een", and  the mistake was adopted this way. The album was the first by the band to feature printed lyrics, although only the lyrics to "World Leader Pretend" appeared.

Green is the first R.E.M. album to also be released in a special edition version, though it was only released as a promotional CD. R.E.M. would go on to create a special edition version of each subsequent album they released, with the exception of their final studio album, 2011's Collapse into Now.

 Release and reception 

Green was released on November 7, 1988, in the United Kingdom, and the following day in the United States. R.E.M. chose the American release date to coincide with the 1988 presidential election, and used its increased profile during the period to criticize Republican candidate George H. W. Bush while praising Democratic candidate Michael Dukakis. With warm critical reaction and the conversion of many new fans, Green ultimately went double-platinum in the US, reaching number 12, and peaked at number 27 in the UK. "Orange Crush" became R.E.M.'s first American number one single on both the Mainstream and Modern Rock Tracks charts. It was the band's first gold album in the UK, making it the quartet's European breakthrough. "What I love about it is the immensely unlikely lyrics," remarked Neil Hannon, frontman of The Divine Comedy, "and, in the mandolin on 'You Are The Everything' and 'The Wrong Child', it's got a bit of what comes later but in a much purer way. It's so small and intense, it's amazing." Village Voice critic Robert Christgau praised the first half of the album, calling it "rousing, funny, serious, elegiac" while panning the second half for "dubious poetry and heavy tempos."

Some advance promo cassettes of the album, dating from September 1988, contained alternate mixes of "World Leader Pretend" (with different intro), "Turn You Inside-Out" (with different ending), and the untitled eleventh track (different drum mix).  All of these mixes are otherwise unreleased.

The band would tour extensively in support of the album throughout 1989, before beginning work on 1991's Out of Time. Green has gone on to sell four million copies worldwide.

R.E.M. supported the album with its biggest and most visually developed tour to date, featuring back-projections and art films playing on the stage. The tour was much larger in scope than the "Work" tour that supported the previous album. This was especially true in venues outside of the United States due to Warner Bros. Records' ability to market the band overseas.  On the final night of the 11-month trek to support Green, at the Fox Theater, in Atlanta, GA, the band performed their first full-length album, Murmur, in order, from start to finish, followed by Green, in order, from start to finish. The night was concluded by an encore set performed by Microwave & the Melons—the road crew led by guitar tech Mark "Microwave" Mytrowitz. It marked the only live performance of "The Wrong Child," and one of the few live performances of "Hairshirt." After the Green tour, the band members unofficially decided to take the following year off, the first extended break in the group's career.

Some songs from Green—such as "Pop Song 89" and "Orange Crush"—had appeared occasionally on the "Work" tour in 1987. Though the lyrics were embryonic, the melodies and arrangements were similar to those that appeared on the finished record.  Similarly, the band began playing versions of "Low" and "Belong" in the later part of the Green Tour, both of which would appear on their next album Out of Time.

Portions of the tour would be filmed for the band's first live video album Tourfilm.

The album was remastered in 2013 for its 25th anniversary, adding the bonus live album Live in Greensboro 1989 by Rhino Records; was released on May 14. Additionally, the EP Live in Greensboro EP was released on April 20 as a promotion for Record Store Day.

Nirvana singer and guitarist Kurt Cobain listed it in his top 50 albums of all time. In 1989, Sounds ranked the album at number 62 in its list of "The Top 80 Albums from the '80s." In 1993, The Times ranked the album at number 70 in their list of "The 100 Best Albums of All Time." In 2013, NME ranked it at number 274 in its list of the "500 Greatest Albums of All Time".

 Track listing 
All songs written by Bill Berry, Peter Buck, Mike Mills, and Michael Stipe.Side one – "Air side""Pop Song 89" – 3:04
"Get Up" – 2:39
"You Are the Everything" – 3:41
"Stand" – 3:10
"World Leader Pretend" – 4:17
"The Wrong Child" – 3:36Side two – "Metal side""Orange Crush" – 3:51
"Turn You Inside-Out" – 4:16
"Hairshirt" – 3:55
"I Remember California" – 4:59
Untitled – 3:1025th anniversary disc two – Live in Greensboro, 1989"Stand" – 3:01
"The One I Love" – 3:18
"So. Central Rain (I'm Sorry)" (digital download bonus track) – 3:39
"Turn You Inside Out" – 4:09
"Belong" – 4:09
"Exhuming McCarthy" – 3:14
"Good Advices" – 3:11
"Orange Crush" – 3:41
"Feeling  Pull" (digital download bonus track) – 6:18
"Cuyahoga" – 4:11
"These Days" – 3:36
"World Leader Pretend" – 4:13
"I Believe" – 4:14
"I Remember California" (digital download bonus track) – 5:23
"Get Up" – 2:34
"Life and How to Live It" – 4:23
"It's the End of the World as We Know It (And I Feel Fine)" – 4:32
"Pop Song 89" – 3:10
"Fall on Me" – 2:56
"You Are the Everything" – 4:29
"Begin the Begin" – 3:38
"King of Birds" (digital download bonus track) – 5:09
"Strange" (digital download bonus track) – 2:44
"Low" – 5:19
"Finest Worksong" – 3:43
"Perfect Circle" – 4:08Record Store Day 2013 Exclusive – Live in Greensboro EP"So. Central Rain (I'm Sorry)" – 3:39
"Feeling  Pull" – 6:18
"Strange" – 2:44
"King of Birds" – 5:09
"I Remember California" – 5:23NotesThe digital download versions of the 25th anniversary edition include all tracks from the Greensboro concert. The five additional songs are inserted in the track list as performed in the original concert.
On the vinyl release, R.E.M. labeled side one (tracks 1–6) as the "Air side" and side two (tracks 7–11) as the "Metal side."
Track 4 ("Stand") is listed on the album as track "R".
Track 11, unlisted on the back cover and unnamed on the disc, is copyrighted under the title "11". It is listed on the digital download version of the 25th anniversary edition as simply "Untitled". An extended instrumental version released as a B-side on certain editions of "Stand" is titled "(The Eleventh Untitled Song)".

 Personnel R.E.M.Bill Berry – drums, percussion, backing vocals, bass guitar on "You Are the Everything", "The Wrong Child", and "Hairshirt"
Peter Buck – guitar, mandolin, drums on "Untitled"
Mike Mills – bass guitar, keyboards, accordion, backing vocals
Michael Stipe – vocalsAdditional musiciansBucky Baxter – pedal steel guitar on "World Leader Pretend"
Peter Holsapple – guitar and keyboards on Live in Greensboro 1989
Keith LeBlanc – percussion on "Turn You Inside-Out"
Jane Scarpantoni – cello on "World Leader Pretend"ProductionBill Berry – production
Peter Buck – production
Thom Cadley – engineering (Bearsville)
Jem Cohen – photography
George Cowan – engineering (Bearsville)
Jay Healy – engineering
Tom Laune – engineering (Ardent)
Scott Litt – production, engineering
Bob Ludwig – mastering, at Masterdisk, New York City, New York, United States
Jon McCafferty – packaging and photography
Mike Mills – production
Frank Olinsky and Manhattan Design – packaging
Michael Stipe – production, packaging, and photography
Michael Tighe – photography

 Chart positions 

Weekly charts

Year-end charts

Singles

Certifications

Release history
In 2005, Warner Bros. Records issued an expanded two-disc edition of Green which includes a CD, a DVD-Audio disc containing a 5.1-channel surround sound mix by Elliot Scheiner, lyrics, and the original CD booklet with expanded liner notes.GreenNote†† 25th anniversary edition, with bonus discBox sets ReferencesWorks cited'''
 Black, Johnny. Reveal: The Story of R.E.M. Backbeat, 2004. 
 Buckley, David. R.E.M.: Fiction: An Alternative Biography. Virgin, 2002. 
 Fletcher, Tony. Remarks Remade: The Story of R.E.M. Omnibus, 2002. .
 Platt, John (editor). The R.E.M. Companion: Two Decades of Commentary''. Schirmer, 1998.

External links 

Green (Adobe Flash) at Radio3Net (streamed copy where licensed)
R.E.M.HQ on Green
 (DVD-Audio edition)

1988 albums
Albums produced by Bill Berry
Albums produced by Michael Stipe
Albums produced by Mike Mills
Albums produced by Peter Buck
Albums produced by Scott Litt
R.E.M. albums
Warner Records albums